The 2012 UCI Road World Championships took place in the southern part of the Dutch province of Limburg, also known as South Limburg, between September 15 and 23. The event consisted of a road race and a time trial for men, women and men under 23, and team time trials for elite men and women. It was the 79th Road World Championships. Castelfidardo near Loreto in Italy was also a candidate, but Italy had held the UCI Road World Championships in Varese in 2008. The Netherlands had last hosted the Road World Championships in 1998, in Valkenburg aan de Geul, and 2012 was the seventh time that the country hosted the championships.

The 2012 championships had a number of changes compared to the former editions. A team time trial was reintroduced. This was last competed as a world championship event in 1994 between nations. The reintroduction will see trade teams compete, similar to the Eindhoven Team Time Trial held between 2005 and 2007. The Junior championships will also be on the programme. With the extra events, the championships will be held over two weekends (nine days) and will also include an opening ceremony and a cyclosportive event.

The start and finish for the events was in Vilt, a commune of Valkenburg aan de Geul on top of the Cauberg.

Schedule

September 21
14:00–16:10 – Road race – Junior Women, 80 km, 5 x Circuit (5 x 16.125 km)
September 22
09:00–13:15 – Road race – Under 23 Men, 177 km, 11 x Circuit (11 x 16.125 km)
14:30–17:45 – Road race – Elite Women, 129 km, 8 x Circuit (8 x 16.125 km)
September 23
09:00–12:10 – Road race – Junior Men, 129 km, 8 x Circuit (8 x 16.125 km)
10:45–17:00 – Road race – Elite Men, 267 km, Start in Maastricht, then, after 106 km through the southern part of the province of Limburg, 10 x Circuit (10 x 16.125 km)

Participating nations

Cyclists from 74 national federations participated. The number of cyclists per nation that competed, excluding riders in the team time trials, is shown in parentheses.

Events summary

Medal table

Team time trials are included under the UCI registration country of the team.

References

External links

 
UCI Road World Championships by year
World Championships
UCI Road World Championships
International cycle races hosted by the Netherlands
Cycling in Limburg (Netherlands)
Cycling in Valkenburg aan de Geul